Santa Filomena is the westernmost city in the Brazilian state of Piauí. The city lies near the Parnaíba River, which forms the border with the state of Maranhão.

The municipality contains part of the Uruçui-Una Ecological Station.

References 

Populated places established in 1962
Municipalities in Piauí